Francesco Benozzo (born 22 February 1969) is an Italian poet, musician and philologist. He works as a Research Fellow in Philology at the University of Bologna, Italy.

Biographical notes

Poetry

Author of long epic poems about natural landscapes, Benozzo usually composes them orally and then performs them with his harp (the last two published are Felci in rivolta / Ferns in revolt [2015]) and La capanna del naufrago / The Castaway's Shack [2017]. Since 2015 he has been nominated for the Nobel Prize in Literature for his poetry in defence of natural places and for his use of techniques belonging to the ancient tradition of oral poetry. In 2016, on the official webpage of the Swedish Academy, he was consecrated by the international readers' jury as the most worthy author for the prize itself.

Philology and Linguistics

In his revolutionary book Speaking Australopithecus (written together with the archaeologist Marcel Otte) he argues for a much greater antiquity of human language than has usually been presumed in recent research (according to which it was born with Homo sapiens at the end of Middle Paleolithic – 50.000 years ago – or at the most with some Neandertal, 200.000 years ago), providing linguistic and archaeological evidence for seeing the appearance of human language with Australopithecus, between 4 and 3 million years ago. He is the author of more than 700 publications, including academic works on oral poetry, shamanism, anarchism, ethnophilology, the Paleolithic continuity theory, and the problem of landscape in literature. He is the general editor of the international journals "Philology" (Peter Lang publisher, Bern-Oxford-New York), "Quaderni di Semantica" (Edizioni dell'Orso, Alessandria, Italy) and "Quaderni di Filologia Romanza" (Pàtron editore, Bologna, Italy).

Music

As a songwriter and harpist, he released 11 CDs, produced in Italy, Denmark and UK (the last published is Ytiddo BPB - Benozzo Performs Bowie [2017]), reaching an international wide appeal (two special mentions at the Edinburgh Folk Awards, one prize as "Best album of the month" assigned by the magazine "RootsWorld", and for two times the National Italian Musical Prize "Giovanna Daffini"). He represented Italian poetry and music in different international happenings, including the Rich Text Literature Festival in Cardiff (Wales), the Tradicionarius Festival in Barcelona (Spain), the Stanza Poetry Festival in St. Andrews (Scotland), the Festival Literario de Madeira (Portugal), and the Printemps des poètes (France) He performed in Rome together with the Nobel Prize Wislawa Szymborska.

Discography
In'tla piola (Sain records, Wales/UK, 2000)
Carte di mare (MusicOn, ITA, 2001) (with Matteo Meschiari)
Il libro di Taliesin (Frame Events, ITA, 2004)
Arpa celtica (Concerto Live, Centro Campostrini, ITA, 2005)
Terracqueo (Tutl Records, DK, 2009)
Libertà l'è morta (Tutl Records, DK, 2013) (with Fabio Bonvicini)
Ponte del diavolo (RadiciMusic, ITA, 2014) (with Fabio Bonvicini)
L'inverno necessario / The Necessary Winter (Tutl Records, DK, 2016)
Un Requiem Laico (ARCI RE, ITA, 2016) (with Fabio Bonvicini & Fratelli Mancuso)
Ytiddo. BPB- Benozzo Performs Bowie (Universalia, ITA, 2017)

Main Poetry Books
Onirico geologico, Ferrara, Edizioni Kolibris, 2014
Felci in rivolta / Ferns in Revolt, with a translation by G. Sutherland, Ferrara, Kolibris, 2016
La capanna del naufrago / The Castaway's Shack, Ferrara, Kolibris, 2017

Main Philological books
Landscape perception in early celtic literature, Aberystwyth, Celtic studies, 2004
La tradizione smarrita: le origini non scritte delle letterature romanze, Roma, Viella, 2007
Cartografie occitaniche: approssimazione alla poesia dei trovatori, Napoli, Liguori, 2008
Etnofilologia: un'introduzione, Napoli, Liguori, 2010
Breviario di etnofilologia, Lecce-Rovato, Pensa Multimedia, 2012
Anarchia e quarto umanesimo: un'intervista su irriverenza, scienza e dissidenza, Bologna, Clueb, 2012
Appello all'UNESCO per liberare Dante dai dantisti, Alessandria, Edizioni dell'Orso, 2013
DESLI: dizionario etimologico-semantico della lingua italiana (con Mario Alinei), Bologna, Pendragon, 2015
The Shamanic Origins of European Culture, Alessandria, Edizioni dell'Orso, 2015
Carducci, Milano, Rizzoli-Corriere della sera, 2016
Il giro del mondo in ottanta saggi, Roma, Aracne, 2016
Speaking Australopithecus. A New Theory on the Origins of Human Language (with Marcel Otte), Alessandria, Edizioni dell'Orso, 2017
DESCI. Dizionario etimologico semantico dei cognomi italiani (with Mario Alinei), Savona, PM edizioni
Falsi germanismi nelle lingue romanze, Alessandria, Edizioni dell’Orso, 2018
Perspectives in Semantics, Edizioni dell’Orso, 2018
Liguri, Etruschi e Celti, Modena, Deputazione di Storia Patria, 2017

References

External links
 Benozzo's website at the University of Bologna
 Website of the Paleolithic Continuity Paradigm

1969 births
Living people
21st-century Italian poets
20th-century Italian poets
Italian musicians
Italian philologists
Italian harpists
Italian essayists
Male essayists
20th-century essayists
21st-century essayists
Italian male non-fiction writers
20th-century Italian male writers